The  is a river in Toyama Prefecture, Japan, that flows through the city of Toyama as well as the town of Tateyama. The river was previously referred to as the Nii River (新川 Nii-kawa).

Route
The river originates in the Tateyama Mountains in the south-eastern area of the city of Toyama. From there, it flows north-west, helping form the border between Toyama and Tateyama. It then cuts through Toyama before emptying into Toyama Bay.

Geographic

Tributary 
 Shomyo River
 Wada River
 Oguti River

Toyama Prefecture
Tateyama, Toyama

See also
 Tateyama Sabō Erosion Control Works Service Train

References

Rivers of Toyama Prefecture
Rivers of Japan